Ronald Charles Taylor BSC (27 October 1924 – 3 August 2018) was a British cinematographer, best known for his collaborations with directors Richard Attenborough and Dario Argento. Throughout his career, he was nominated for two BAFTA Awards for Best Cinematography and won an Academy Award for his work on Gandhi (1982), which he shared with Billy Williams.

Life and career 
Taylor was born in Hampstead, London and entered the film industry in his late teens working for Gainsborough Pictures at Lime Grove in Shepherd's Bush. Taylor's first film was as a clapper boy on The Young Mr. Pitt (1942). That same year he entered the Merchant Navy. After the end of the Second World War returned to the film industry. He became a camera operator and went on to become a director of photography, winning an Oscar for Gandhi (1982). Taylor's final film was the Dario Argento-directed giallo film Sleepless (2001), after which he retired to Spain. 

He is featured in the book Conversations with Cinematographers by David A Ellis, published by Scarecrow Press.

Selected filmography

Notes

External links 

Ronnie Taylor BSC – British Cinematographer

1924 births
2018 deaths
British cinematographers
Best Cinematographer Academy Award winners
British expatriates in Spain
People from Hampstead